Polk Township is a township in Taylor County, Iowa, USA.

History
Polk Township is named for President James K. Polk.

References

Townships in Taylor County, Iowa
Townships in Iowa